Dinglewood House is a National Register of Historic Places listed building located at 1429 Dinglewood St., Columbus, Georgia. Joel Early Hurt built the Italianate house for his wife Frances and daughter Julia in 1858 and spared no expense. Columbus architecture firm Barringer & Morton produced the drawings.

The house reflects several architectural styles:  it has French windows, Italianate overhanging eaves with decorative brackets, and a Classical Revival-style entrance with Corinthian columns.

References

Italianate architecture in Georgia (U.S. state)
Houses on the National Register of Historic Places in Georgia (U.S. state)
Houses completed in 1858
Houses in Columbus, Georgia
National Register of Historic Places in Muscogee County, Georgia